Justice Alexander may refer to:

Fritz W. Alexander II (1926–2000), judge of the New York Court of Appeals
Donald G. Alexander (born 1942), justice of the Maine Supreme Judicial Court
Gerry L. Alexander (born 1936), chief justice of the Supreme Court of Washington
James P. Alexander (1883–1948), chief justice of Texas
Joan K. Alexander (born 1961/62), justice of the Connecticut Supreme Court
Julian P. Alexander (1887–1953), justice of the Supreme Court Mississippi